In descriptive statistics, the interquartile range (IQR) is a measure of statistical dispersion, which is the spread of the data. The IQR may also be called the midspread, middle 50%, fourth spread, or H‑spread. It is defined as the difference between the 75th and 25th percentiles of the data. To calculate the IQR, the data set is divided into quartiles, or four rank-ordered even parts via linear interpolation. These quartiles are denoted by Q1 (also called the lower quartile), Q2 (the median), and Q3 (also called the upper quartile). The lower quartile corresponds with the 25th percentile and the upper quartile corresponds with the 75th percentile, so IQR = Q3 −  Q1.

The IQR is an example of a trimmed estimator, defined as the 25% trimmed range, which enhances the accuracy of dataset statistics by dropping lower contribution, outlying points. It is also used as a robust measure of scale It can be clearly visualized by the box on a box plot.

Use
Unlike total range, the interquartile range has a breakdown point of 25%, and is thus often preferred to the total range.

The IQR is used to build box plots, simple graphical representations of a probability distribution.

The IQR is used in businesses as a marker for their income rates.

For a symmetric distribution (where the median equals the midhinge, the average of the first and third quartiles), half the IQR equals the median absolute deviation (MAD).

The median is the corresponding measure of central tendency.

The IQR can be used to identify outliers (see below). The IQR also may indicate the skewness of the dataset.

 The quartile deviation or semi-interquartile range is defined as half the IQR.

Algorithm
The IQR of a set of values is calculated as the difference between the upper and lower quartiles, Q3 and Q1. Each quartile is a median calculated as follows.

Given an even 2n or odd 2n+1 number of values
first quartile Q1 = median of the n smallest values
third quartile Q3 = median of the n largest values

The second quartile Q2 is the same as the ordinary median.

Examples

Data set in a table
The following table has 13 rows, and follows the rules for the odd number of entries.

For the data in this table the interquartile range is IQR = Q3 − Q1 = 119 - 31 = 88.

Data set in a plain-text box plot
                    
                             +−−−−−+−+     
               * |−−−−−−−−−−−|     | |−−−−−−−−−−−|
                             +−−−−−+−+    
                    
 +−−−+−−−+−−−+−−−+−−−+−−−+−−−+−−−+−−−+−−−+−−−+−−−+   number line
 0   1   2   3   4   5   6   7   8   9   10  11  12
  

For the data set in this box plot:
 lower (first) quartile Q1 = 7
 median (second quartile) Q2 = 8.5
 upper (third) quartile Q3 = 9
 interquartile range, IQR = Q3 - Q1 = 2
 lower 1.5*IQR whisker = Q1 - 1.5 * IQR = 7 - 3 = 4. (If there is no data point at 4, then the lowest point greater than 4.)
 upper 1.5*IQR whisker = Q3 + 1.5 * IQR = 9 + 3 = 12. (If there is no data point at 12, then the highest point less than 12.)
This means the 1.5*IQR whiskers can be uneven in lengths. The median, minimum, maximum, and the first and third quartile constitute the Five-number summary.

Distributions
The interquartile range of a continuous distribution can be calculated by integrating the probability density function (which yields the cumulative distribution function—any other means of calculating the CDF will also work). The lower quartile, Q1, is a number such that integral of the PDF from -∞ to Q1 equals 0.25, while the upper quartile, Q3, is such a number that the integral from -∞ to Q3 equals 0.75; in terms of the CDF, the quartiles can be defined as follows:

where CDF−1 is the quantile function.

The interquartile range and median of some common distributions are shown below

Interquartile range test for normality of distribution
The IQR, mean, and standard deviation of a population P can be used in a simple test of whether or not P is normally distributed, or Gaussian. If P is normally distributed, then the standard score of the first quartile, z1, is −0.67, and the standard score of the third quartile, z3, is +0.67. Given mean =  and standard deviation = σ for P, if P is normally distributed, the first quartile

and the third quartile

If the actual values of the first or third quartiles differ substantially from the calculated values, P is not normally distributed. However, a normal distribution can be trivially perturbed to maintain its Q1 and Q2 std. scores at 0.67 and −0.67 and not be normally distributed (so the above test would produce a false positive). A better test of normality, such as Q–Q plot would be indicated here.

Outliers

The interquartile range is often used to find outliers in data. Outliers here are defined as observations that fall below Q1 − 1.5 IQR or above Q3 + 1.5 IQR. In a boxplot, the highest and lowest occurring value within this limit are indicated by whiskers of the box (frequently with an additional bar at the end of the whisker) and any outliers as individual points.

See also
 Interdecile range
 Midhinge
 Probable error
 Robust measures of scale

References

External links

Scale statistics
Wikipedia articles with ASCII art